Peponia is a village and a community of the Voio municipality. In the late Ottoman period, it was inhabited by Vallahades; in the 1900 statistics of Vasil Kanchov, where the town appears under its Bulgarian name "Laya", it was inhabited by some 300 "Greek Muslims".
Before the 2011 local government reform it was part of the municipality of Neapoli, of which it was a municipal district. The 2011 census recorded 70 inhabitants in the village.

References

Populated places in Kozani (regional unit)